Geraldine Bonner (pen name, Hard Pan; 1870–1930) was an American author.

Biography
Geraldine Bonner was born on Staten Island, New York. Her father, John Bonner, was a journalist and historical writer. As a child, the family moved to Colorado and she lived in mining camps. After moving to San Francisco, California, she worked at a newspaper, the Argonaut, in 1887, and subsequently, she wrote the novel Hard Pan (1900) and used the name "Hard Pan" as a pseudonym. Bonner also wrote short stories which were published in Collier's Weekly, Harper's Weekly, Harper's Monthly, and Lippincott's.

Bonner died on June 18, 1930, in New York City.

Publications

Books
 Hard Pan, (1900)  
 Tomorrow's Tangle, (1902)
 The Pioneer, (1905)  
 The Castlecourt Diamond Case, (1906)  
 The Book of Evelyn, (1913)  
 The Girl at Central, (1914)  
 The Black Eagle Mystery, (1916)  
 Treasure and Trouble Therewith, (1917) 
 Miss Maitland, Private Secretary, (1919)

Plays
Along with Elmer Blaney Harris, she wrote the play Sham in 1908.  
Along with Harry Hutcheson Boyd, she wrote the play Sauce for the Goose in 1909.

References

External links

 
 
 

1870 births
1930 deaths
20th-century American novelists
American women novelists
American women short story writers
19th-century American novelists
Novelists from Colorado
Writers from San Francisco
20th-century American women writers
19th-century American women writers
Women mystery writers
19th-century American short story writers
20th-century American short story writers